Hamid ul Haq (born 1 March 1964) is Pakistani politician who had been a member of the National Assembly of Pakistan, from June 2013 to May 2018.

Early life and education

Haq was born on 1 August 1964.

He holds a degree of Bachelor of Science in civil engineering from the University of Engineering and Technology, Peshawar which he received in 1988.

Political career
Haq ran for the seat of Provincial Assembly of Khyber Pakhtunkhwa as a candidate of Pakistan Tehreek-e-Insaf (PTI) from Constituency PK-05 (Peshawar-V) in 2002 general elections but was unsuccessful. He received 1,443 votes and lost the seat to a candidate of Muttahida Majlis-e-Amal.

He was elected to the National Assembly of Pakistan from NA-2 (Peshawar-II) as a candidate of PTI in 2013 general elections. He received 79,125 votes and defeated a candidate of Jamiat Ulema-e Islam (F).

References 

Pakistan Tehreek-e-Insaf politicians
Pashtun people
Pakistani MNAs 2013–2018
Pakistani civil engineers
People from Peshawar
1964 births
Living people